Marcus Williams is the name of:

Marcus Williams (tight end) (born 1977), American football player for the Oakland Raiders 
Marcus Williams (basketball, born 1985), UConn guard and New Jersey, Golden State, and Memphis
Marcus Williams (basketball, born 1986), Arizona forward/guard and San Antonio Spurs
Marcus Williams (footballer) (born 1986), English footballer
Marcus Williams (cornerback) (born 1991), American football
Marcus Williams (safety) (born 1996), American football
Marcus Williams (basketball, born 2002), college basketball player for the San Francisco Dons
Marcus Williams (artist), New Zealand artist

See also
Mark Williams (disambiguation)
Marc Williams (born 1988), Welsh footballer
 Marc Williams, DJ, musician, producer (The Three Amigos)
 List of people with surname Williams

Williams, Marcus